André-Charles Cailleau (1731–1798) was a French book publisher, bookseller and man of letters.

Life 

He was born on 17 June 1731 in Touraine, France.

He was a contemporary of Jacques Charles Brunet.

He died on 12 June 1798 in Paris, France.

Career 

Along with Laurent-François Prault, he was one of the most well known and established book publishers and printers of France.

Works 

His most well known works are:

 Lettres et épîtres amoureuses d'Héloïse et d'Abeilard, tant en vers qu'en prose (Love letters and epistles of Héloïse and Abélard, as much in verse as in prose), 1798
 The Evenings of the Countryside, 1766
 Dictionnaire bibliographique, historique et critique des livres rares (A Dictionary of Bibliographical, Historical and Rare Books) with R. Duclos, 3 volumes, 1790

References

External links 

1731 births
1798 deaths
French publishers (people)